The Charles and Theresa Cornelius House is located in Neillsville, Wisconsin.

History
Charles Cornelius was a noted businessman and banker. After his death, the house was converted into a funeral home and later apartments before efforts began to turn it back into a single dwelling. It was added to the State Register of Historic Places in 2012 and to the National Register of Historic Places the following year.

References

Houses on the National Register of Historic Places in Wisconsin
National Register of Historic Places in Clark County, Wisconsin
Houses in Clark County, Wisconsin
Death care companies of the United States
Queen Anne architecture in Wisconsin
Houses completed in 1909